Ellen Chan Ar-Lun (born February 16, 1966) is a Hong Kong actress and singer who has appeared in a number of Hong Kong film productions.

Filmography 
 Alibis (1977)
 Grow Up in Anger (1986) 
 Fury (1988) 
 How To Pick Girls Up (1988) 
 The Inspector Wears Skirts (1988) 
 Aces Go Places V: The Terracotta Hit (1989) 
 Second Childhood (1989) 
 Perfect Match (1989) 
 Off Track (1990) 
 Lung Fung Restaurant (1990) 
 Tiger on the Beat II (1990)
 The Other Half (1990)  
 Alien Wife (1991) 
 Doctor Vampire (1991) 
 Wizard's Curse (1992)
 All-Mighty Gamber (1992)  
 The Love that is Wrong (1993) 
 Fatal Love (1993) 
 On Parole (1993) 
 Hello, Who Is It? (1994) [cameo] 
 Switch Over (1994) 
 Why Wild Girls (1994) 
 Eternal Evil of Asia (1995) 
 Salon Beauty (2002) [V] 
 Market's Romance (2002) 
 Unarm 72 Hours (2003) 
 Spirit in a Violent House (2003) 
 Men Suddenly in Black (2003) [cameo]
 Her Story (2004)
 Exiled (2006)
 The Underdog Knight (2008)
 Naked Soldier (2012)
 7 Assassins (2013)

References

External links
  
 
 lovehkfilm.com entry

20th-century Hong Kong actresses
21st-century Hong Kong actresses
1966 births
Living people